The Battle of Valls was fought on 25 February 1809, during the Peninsular War, between a French force under Laurent Gouvion Saint-Cyr and a Spanish force under Theodor von Reding. Fought near the town of Valls in Catalonia, Spain, the battle ended in a French victory. General Reding was fatally wounded during a cavalry charge against French cavalry.

Background
The Spanish campaign in early 1809 started with the Battle of Uclés.

Battle
During actions on 15 February 1809, Reding's left wing was cut off from reinforcement by a French attack. Reding decided to retrieve this cut-off army, instead of counter striking at Souham. Planning to meet up with his northern units, Reding left Tarragona with only 2,000 men and most of his cavalry. On his way, he successfully met with units standing guard over the pass to Santa Cristina and another unit at Santas Cruces. Having sufficient strength, he continued to the town of Santa Coloma, whereupon he met with his previously cut-off left wing. With the combined left wing and the forces he took with him, Reding then had a total of almost 20,000 troops at his disposal. Deciding to defend Tarragona, he dispatched 4–5,000 of his men to watch Igualada and pressed home with his remaining men. St. Cyr, aware of Reding's movements, moved to block the two direct routes of returning to Tarragona. Reding, aware that Souham had moved and taken position in the town of Valls, still decided to take the route. Committing his forces to a march at night, Reding got his army to a bridge only two miles out of the town before daybreak.

Upon arriving at the bridge, Reding's vanguard was involved in a skirmish with men of Souham's division. Both commanders, realizing that the time for battle had arrived, rushed to get their men into position. Souham brought the rest of his division out of Valls and set them into position north of town. Reding, deciding this division to be insignificant, pushed his advanced line and most of his center across the river, continuing to send more across until the French division finally broke and fell back to Valls. At this point, most of his men and baggage train had crossed the bridge, but he nonetheless decided to give his men a long break. St. Cyr, learning of the attack later in the day, rushed to Valls with the 7th Italian Dragoons, also bringing the Italian division which would be delayed for six hours before joining the French line at Valls. Having seen the French line rallying when St. Cyr arrived with the Italian Cavalry, Reding pulled his forces back across the river in a defensive position. After three hours had passed, the Italian division had finally caught up to St. Cyr, who formed the French line of battle and crossed the river under constant bombardment. The Spanish forces poured fire onto the French attackers but as the columned French grew close to the Spanish line, the Spaniards began to rout. The only point of hand-to-hand combat came when Reding took his staff and cavalry and attacked the left column, only to be met by the Italian dragoons. in the ensuing melee, Reding himself took three fatal wounds.

French order of battle

Aftermath
The Spanish campaign in early 1809 proceeded with the French advance in Catalonia in the Third siege of Girona and the Battle of Alcañiz.

Notes

References

Further reading

External links
 

Battles of the Peninsular War
Battles involving Spain
Battles involving France
1809 in Spain
Conflicts in 1809
February 1809 events
Battles in Catalonia
Battles inscribed on the Arc de Triomphe